Erubey Chango Carmona is a Mexican former professional boxer who won the WBC lightweight title in 1972.

Carmona is believed to be the boxer who began the tradition of having a big fight on the Mexico Independence Day holiday weekend when he stopped Mando Ramos in the eighth round to win the lightweight title in Los Angeles on Sept. 15, 1972.

Chango lost a combined 4 fights to two fighters. He lost to Arturo Morales in back to back fights in 1965 and 1966, and he lost to Alfredo El Canelo Urbina back to back in 1967. He lost the WBC Lightweight title to Rodolfo González in 1972 at the Sports arena in Los Angeles.

Carmona held two titles the Mexican lightweight title, and the WBC lightweight title. He now has 7 grandchildren. two from each of his daughters and one from his son. Mitzy Munoz and Cindy Munoz from his daughter Dianey.

See also
List of WBC world champions
List of Mexican boxing world champions

References

External links
 

Boxers from Mexico City
World Boxing Council champions
1944 births
Living people
Mexican male boxers
Lightweight boxers